Mia Hubert is a Belgian mathematical statistician known for her research on topics in robust statistics including medoid-based clustering, regression depth, the medcouple for robustly measuring skewness, box plots for skewed data, and robust principal component analysis, and for her implementations of robust statistical algorithms in the R statistical software system, MATLAB, and S-PLUS. She is a professor in the statistics and data science section of the department of mathematics at KU Leuven.

Education and career
Hubert earned a diploma in mathematics in 1992 from the University of Antwerp, and obtained her Ph.D. in 1997 at the same university. Her dissertation, Robust Regression for Data Analysis, was supervised by Peter Rousseeuw. She joined the KU Leuven faculty in 2001.

She was the original developer of the R package cluster along with Peter Rousseeuw and Anja Struyf.

Recognition
Hubert became an Elected Member of the International Statistical Institute in 2013.

Selected publications

References

External links

Cluster R package

Year of birth missing (living people)
Living people
Belgian statisticians
Women statisticians
University of Antwerp alumni
Academic staff of KU Leuven
Elected Members of the International Statistical Institute
R (programming language) people